The Men's Epee Individual A wheelchair fencing competition at the 2004 Summer Paralympics was held on 20 September at the Helliniko Fencing Hall.

The event was won by Cyril More, representing .

Results

Preliminaries

Pool A

Pool B

Pool C

Competition bracket

References

M